Ustad Bahauddin Khan Qawwal (1934 – 3 February 2006) was a Pakistani Qawwali musician.

All five of his sons - Muhammad Najmuddin (born 1967), Saifuddin Mehmood (born 1971), Zafeeruddin Ahmed (born 1977), Mughisuddin Hassan (born 1979) and Ehtishamuddin Hussain (born 1981) - have followed in his footsteps. Traditional Qawwali singing heritage of the city of Karachi can still be felt and seen in a small neighborhood in Karachi named Qawwali Gali in the Saddar Town area, where a street is named after Bahauddin Qawwal.

Early life
Bahauddin Khan is descended from a family of musicians which traces its lineage back to the days of Amir Khusrow of the 13th century India. To propagate Islam throughout South Asia, Amir Khusrow banded together twelve youngsters (12 Kids Band), and personally trained them in singing and performing Qawwali, a genre of devotional Sufi music.  He appointed Mian Saamat as the leader of this group, which was named the Qawwal Bachche (the qawwal kids).  The Qawwal Bachche, in turn, taught Qawwali to other aspiring students.

Bahauddin Qawwal was born in 1934 in British India and died in Karachi on 3 Feb 2006 in Karachi, Pakistan. Bahauddin belonged to the Qawwal Bacchon gharana of Delhi, which was founded by Hazrat Khwaja Ameer Khusro. Bahauddin is also the maternal nephew of famous Qawwal and classical singer Ustad Aziz Ahmed Khan Warsi. He received formal musical training from his father, Suleman Khan, and his uncle, Sardar Khan.

Career
He began giving public performances, and won prizes and acclaim, from the early age of six, individually and also as an active member of the group Manzoor Niazi Qawwal and party. In 1947, he was decorated as Nunhay Raagi, in 1949 he received Certificate of Performance, and in 1951 earned the title of Nunhay Hind Raagi from the Indian Prime Minister. In 2000, he was awarded with the title Tamgha-i-Imtiaz by the President of Pakistan, and in 2002 earned the title of Ustad from the Vice President of Mauritius and also received Gold Medal and Commemorative Shield from the Minister of Arts & Culture.  In 2003, he received the "In the name of Allah" Award from Viqar-e-Adab, an organization working for the revival, propagation, development and betterment of arts & culture.

In 1956, Bahauddin left the court of the Nizam of Hyderabad, India and migrated to Pakistan. There he started afresh with his cousins Munshi Raziuddin and Manzoor Ahmed Niazi which included his brother and other nephews also, under the patronage and guidance of his father, Suleman Khan.

In 1966, Bahauddin went solo under his own name, and in 1969, in recognition of his masterly rendition of Qawwali, eminent personalities and lovers of Qawwali crowned him Ashraf-ul-Mousiqaraan.

Bahauddin performed all over the world, touring Europe, the Middle East, East and South Africa, Iran and India several times.

The National Centre for the Performing Arts (India) has recorded his classical style of Qawwali on the Golden Tape for safe-keeping up to 200 years, as a reference and guide for researchers and scholars.  Dr. Zoe Ansari, a research scholar and historian, recorded him for inclusion on a two- cassette audio-biography of Amir Khusro. The French broadcasting authorities and the BBC have also recorded Bahauddin for purposes of research and reference.  His Qawwalis in Urdu, Persian and Arabic are regularly telecast in Pakistan.  They have also been sent to Iran, Iraq, Afghanistan and some Central Asian Countries on special requests.

Bahauddin Qawwal and his family have been continuously attached to Sufi orders for the last seven centuries. They have been granted permanent rooms adjacent to the shrines of Moinuddin Chishti, Nizamuddin Auliya and Alauddin Sabir Kaliyari, in Ajmer, Delhi and Kalyar respectively, due to their regular services to and continuous attachment with these Sufi saints. Furthermore, the descendants of Nizamuddin Auliya conferred a Certificate of Affiliation on him and turbaned him and his sons in recognition of their family's attachment to the Sufi order of Nizamuddin Auliya.

Bahauddin held many positions at different organizations dedicated to the revival and development of Qawwali. He has released 9 VCDs/CDs and 39 video/audio cassettes and records. In 1978, Hilton Movies recorded a Qawwali of his for their film Gardish.

Lineage
Bahauddin's sons have followed in his footsteps.  In May 1999, Lok Virsa invited his sons Najmuddin and Saifuddin to perform at Islamabad at the National Youth Festival. In November–December 2005, they toured the UK, performing 13 concerts in 10 different cities.  They went on to tour Switzerland in January 2006, performing in 6 cities.  These concerts were arranged to raise funds for the victims of the 2005 Kashmir earthquake. Najmuddin and Saifuddin were recorded by Iran Radio, Zahidan, during their visit to Iran in 2000, and by the government network Pakistan Television as well the private ARY Digital network. They have received Hazrat Amir Khusro Award and New Qawali Talent Award for their performances. They released an audio-cassette in 2003 and in 2004.

After Qawwal Bahauddin Khan's death, the Sindh Minister for Sports and Culture established the Bahauddin Qawwal Award in his honor.

References

1934 births
2006 deaths
Pakistani qawwali singers
Muhajir people
Pakistani qawwali groups
20th-century Pakistani male singers